Torgelow am See is a municipality in the Mecklenburgische Seenplatte district, in Mecklenburg-Vorpommern, Germany. It is part of the Seenlandschaft Waren Amt, that is based in the nearby town of Waren.

The Schloss Torgelow is home to one of Germany's most renowned private schools, the Internatsgymnasium Schloss Torgelow.

External links

Schloss Torgelow, private school website

References